Joseph Patrick Costello (born June 1, 1960) is an American former football defensive end who played in the National Football League for the Atlanta Falcons and Los Angeles Raiders from 1986 to 1989.

References

Living people
1960 births
American football defensive ends
Atlanta Falcons players
Los Angeles Raiders players
National Football League replacement players